Brepollen ("The Glacier Bay") is a bay in Sørkapp Land and Torell Land at Spitsbergen, Svalbard. It is located at the inner part of Hornsund, surrounded by the glaciers Mendeleevbreen, Svalisbreen, Hornbreen and Storbreen.

References

Bays of Spitsbergen